Wendy Rosalind James,  (born 4 February 1940) is a British retired social anthropologist and academic. She was Professor of Social Anthropology at the University of Oxford from 1996 to 2007, and President of the Royal Anthropological Institute from 2001 to 2004.

Early life and education
James was born on 4 February 1940 to William Stanley James and Isabel James (née Lunt). She was educated at Kelsick School, a grammar school in Ambleside, Cumbria. She studied geography at St Hugh's College, Oxford, graduating with a Bachelor of Arts (BA) in 1962.

James's interest in Africa was developed through the stories her father told her about his time working in Uganda and her interest in anthropology was sparked during a "'hands-on' introductory course at the Pitt Rivers Museum" in Oxford during her undergraduate degree. She therefore changed direction and remained at St Hugh's College studying anthropology, completing a Bachelor of Letters (BLitt) degree in 1964. She undertook postgraduate research on a part-time basis at Oxford, completing her Doctor of Philosophy (DPhil) degree in 1970. Her doctoral dissertation was titled "Principles of social organisation among the Uduk speaking people of the southern Fung region, Republic of the Sudan".

Academic career
From 1964 to 1969, James was a lecturer in social anthropology at the University of Khartoum in Sudan. During this time, she "conducted traditional ethnographic research among the Uduk people living in the Blue Nile region along the Sudan/Ethiopian border". From 1969 to 1971, she was a Leverhulme research Fellow at St Hugh's College, Oxford. Between 1971 and 1972, she was a visiting lecturer at the University of Bergen.

In 1972, James was elected a Fellow of St Cross College, Oxford, and appointed a University Lecturer in social anthropology at Oxford's School of Anthropology. She was awarded a Title of Distinction as Professor of Social Anthropology in July 1996. In 2007, she retired from full-time academia and was appointed an Emeritus Fellow of St Cross College.

In addition to her university positions, James held a number of appointments. She was President of the Royal Anthropological Institute from 2001 to 2004. She was Vice-President of the British Institute in Eastern Africa from 2001 to 2011. She worked as an occasional consultant to bodies such as the United Nations Operation Lifeline Sudan, the United Nations High Commissioner for Refugees, the United Kingdom's Foreign and Commonwealth Office.

Personal life
In 1977, James married Douglas H. Johnson, a British historian and academic. Together, they have had two children: one son and one daughter.

Honours
James was awarded the Amaury Talbot Prize for African Anthropology by the Royal Anthropological Institute for her monograph The Listening Ebony: Moral Knowledge, Religion and Power among the Uduk of Sudan in 1988. In 2005, she was awarded an honorary Dr Scientiarum Anthropologicarum (DSc) degree by the University of Copenhagen. She was awarded the Rivers Memorial Medal by the Royal Anthropological Institute in 2009.

In 1999, James was elected a Fellow of the British Academy (FBA), the United Kingdom's national academy for the humanities and social sciences. In the 2011 Queen's Birthday Honours, she was appointed a Commander of the Order of the British Empire (CBE) "for services to scholarship".

Selected works

References

External links
 Interviewed by Alan Macfarlane 15 May 2009 (video)

1940 births
Living people
British anthropologists
British women anthropologists
Social anthropologists
Alumni of St Hugh's College, Oxford
Fellows of St Hugh's College, Oxford
Fellows of St Cross College, Oxford
Academic staff of the University of Khartoum
Fellows of the British Academy
Commanders of the Order of the British Empire
Fellows of the Royal Anthropological Institute of Great Britain and Ireland
Presidents of the Royal Anthropological Institute of Great Britain and Ireland